Science Fiction Master Index of Names is a book by Keith L. Justice published in 1987.

Plot summary
Science Fiction Master Index of Names is a guide to science fiction critical mentions.

Reception
Dave Langford reviewed Science Fiction Master Index of Names for White Dwarf #91, and stated that "Despite [...] biggish omissions, the book could still be handy in its extremely specialist field."

Reviews
Review by Paul Kincaid (1987) in Vector 138

References

Science fiction books